Mineral County is a county located in the U.S. state of Colorado. As of the 2020 census, the population was 865, making it the third-least populous county in Colorado, behind San Juan County and Hinsdale County. The county seat and only incorporated municipality in the county is Creede. The county was named for the many valuable minerals found in the mountains and streams of the area.

Geography

Adjacent counties
Saguache County - northeast
Rio Grande County - east
Archuleta County - south
Hinsdale County - west

Major Highways
  U.S. Highway 160
  State Highway 149

National protected areas
Rio Grande National Forest
San Juan National Forest
La Garita Wilderness
Weminuche Wilderness

Trails and byways
Colorado Trail
Continental Divide National Scenic Trail
Lake Fork National Recreation Trail
Silver Thread Scenic Byway

Demographics

At the 2000 census, there were 831 people in 377 households, including 251 families, in the county. The population density was 1 people per square mile (0/km2). There were 1,119 housing units at an average density of 1 per square mile (0/km2). The racial makeup of the county was 96.87% White, 0.84% Native American, 0.12% from other races, and 2.17% from two or more races. 2.05% of the population were Hispanic or Latino of any race.

Of the 377 households 22.30% had children under the age of 18 living with them, 57.00% were married couples living together, 5.80% had a female householder with no husband present, and 33.40% were non-families. 28.10% of households were one person and 9.80% were one person aged 65 or older. The average household size was 2.20 and the average family size was 2.70.

The age distribution was 20.50% under the age of 18, 4.70% from 18 to 24, 24.80% from 25 to 44, 32.70% from 45 to 64, and 17.30% 65 or older. The median age was 45 years. For every 100 females there were 104.20 males. For every 100 females age 18 and over, there were 99.10 males.

The median household income was $34,844 and the median family income was $40,833. Males had a median income of $28,750 versus $19,375 for females. The per capita income for the county was $24,475. About 9.30% of families and 10.20% of the population were below the poverty line, including 18.70% of those under age 18 and 10.60% of those age 65 or over.

Mineral County has an extremely high proportion of land under federal ownership, with 96% of the county under the management of the federal government (It houses an office of, and is surrounded by, the Rio Grande National Forest).

2015
As of 2015 the largest self-reported ancestry groups in Mineral County, Colorado are:

Politics

Communities

Town
Creede

Unincorporated Communities
Spar City
Wagon Wheel Gap

Ghost Towns
Bachelor City
Weaver

See also

Outline of Colorado
Index of Colorado-related articles
National Register of Historic Places listings in Mineral County, Colorado

References

Further reading
Foley, N.K. et al. (1993). Mineralogy, mineral chemistry, and paragenesis of gold, silver, and base-metal ores of the North Amethyst vein system, San Juan Mountains, Mineral County, Colorado [U.S. Geological Survey Professional Paper 1537]. Washington, D.C.: U.S. Department of the Interior, U.S. Geological Survey.

External links

Creede and Mineral County information
Colorado County Evolution by Don Stanwyck
Colorado Historical Society

 
Colorado counties
1893 establishments in Colorado
Populated places established in 1893